JVT may refer to:

 Joint Video Team, providing Advanced Video Coding standards
 John Van Tongeren, American musician and composer
 Jonathan Van-Tam, British specialist in influenza and pandemic preparedness
 JVT, a 1955 car raced by Len Terry